Sanjoo  is a  town and tehsil in Nagaur districtof Rajasthan, India. The town has a population of about 7,688.

Geography

It lies (971 feet) at co-ords 27°00′27″N 74°09′49″E. Sanjoo is located 20.01 km from nearby town, Degana Junction and 58.26 km from its District headquarters Nagaur. It is 163 km far from its State capital, Jaipur.

References

Villages in Nagaur district